John Nilson is a retired  Canadian politician in Saskatchewan. He was the member of the Legislative Assembly of Saskatchewan for the Regina Lakeview constituency from 1995 to 2016, representing the Saskatchewan New Democratic Party. A former lawyer with the Saskatchewan law firm Macpherson Leslie and Tyerman, he was first elected in the 1995 provincial election. He announced his retirement prior to the 2016 provincial election

Nilson was educated at Pacific Lutheran University, the University of Oslo, at St. Olaf College in Minnesota and the University of British Columbia. He was admitted to the British Columbia bar in 1978 and to the Saskatchewan bar in 1979.

He was appointed as Minister of Justice and Attorney General on November 22, 1995, Minister of Crown Investments Corporation on September 30, 1999, Minister of Health on February 7, 2001, where he was Saskatchewan's longest serving health minister and then Minister of Environment on February 3, 2006.

In the wake of the NDP's loss in the 2011 election and the resignation of leader Dwain Lingenfelter, Nilson, who was re-elected, was declared interim leader of the party. He was succeeded by Cam Broten in the leadership election on March 9, 2013.

Nilson announced his retirement in the fall of 2015, and continued to sit as an MLA until the Assembly was dissolved for the 2016 general election.

Electoral history 

|-
 
|NDP
|John Nilson
|align="right"|3,860
|align="right"|48.38
|align="right"|+0.76

|- bgcolor="white"
!align="left" colspan=3|Total
!align="right"|
!align="right"|100.00
!align="right"|

|-
 
|NDP
|John Nilson
|align="right"|4,275
|align="right"|47.62
|align="right"|-9,29

|- bgcolor="white"
!align="left" colspan=3|Total
!align="right"|8,976
!align="right"|100.00
!align="right"|

|-
 
|NDP
|John Nilson
|align="right"|4,988
|align="right"|56.91
|align="right"| +7.60

|- bgcolor="white"
!align="left" colspan=3|Total
!align="right"|8,976
!align="right"|100.00
!align="right"|

|-
 
|NDP
|John Nilson
|align="right"|4,207
|align="right"|49.31
|align="right"| -5.38

|- bgcolor="white"
!align="left" colspan=3|Total
!align="right"|8,976
!align="right"|100.00
!align="right"|

|-
 
|NDP
|John Nilson
|align="right"|4,807
|align="right"|54.69
|align="right"|–

|- bgcolor="white"
!align="left" colspan=3|Total
!align="right"|8,976
!align="right"|100.00
!align="right"|

References

External links
Saskatchewan New Democrats: Regina Lakeview

Canadian people of Norwegian descent
Saskatchewan New Democratic Party MLAs
1951 births
Living people
Politicians from Regina, Saskatchewan
Politicians from Saskatoon
Leaders of the Saskatchewan CCF/NDP
Pacific Lutheran University alumni
St. Olaf College alumni
University of Oslo alumni
University of British Columbia alumni
21st-century Canadian politicians